Western Magnetics is the fourth studio album by the Canadian rock band Mystery Machine.

Track listing
"Pronto"
"Japanese-Dads"
"Runways"
"Octagon Skylight"
"Floatist"
"We Won't Return"
"House On Fire"
"Snow"
"Bullshit Patrol"
"Northern Analog"

References

2012 albums
Mystery Machine (band) albums